(or ; plural form ) is a Latin phrase meaning "note well".
It is often abbreviated as NB, n.b., or with the ligature 
and first appeared in English writing .  In Modern English, it is used, particularly in legal papers, to draw the attention of the reader to a certain (side) aspect or detail of the subject being addressed. While NB is also often used in academic writing, note is a common substitute.

The markings used to draw readers' attention in medieval manuscripts are also called  marks. The common medieval markings do not, however, include the abbreviation NB.

See also 

 Annotation
 Footnote
 List of Latin abbreviations
 List of Latin phrases
 List of legal Latin terms
 Obiter dictum
 Postscript
 Quod vide

References

Latin literary phrases
Legal terminology